Taru Moana (died 1 August 1988) was a Cook Islands chief and politician. He served as a member of the Legislative Assembly from 1965 to 1974.

Biography
Moana was a farmer, chief and church leader, serving as president of the Kouti Nui group of chiefs in Arorangi and as a spokesman for the Tinomana ariki.

A supporter of the Cook Islands Progressive Association, he joined the Cook Islands Party after its establishment in 1964. He contested the Puaikura seat in the 1965 general elections and was elected to the Legislative Assembly. He was re-elected in 1968 and 1972, but lost his seat in the 1974 elections.

He died in Arorangi in August 1988.

References

Cook Island farmers
Cook Islands Party politicians
Members of the Parliament of the Cook Islands
1988 deaths
Date of birth missing